Abu'l-Hasan Ali ibn Fadl ibn Ahmad Isfarayini (died 1013/14), commonly known as Abu'l-Hasan Isfarayini, was a Persian vizier of the Ghaznavid sultan Mahmud of Ghazni from 998 to 1010.

Biography 
Isfarayini was most likely from the town of Isfarayin in the northwestern part of Khurasan. Not much is known about his early life; he began his career as a Samanid secretary (dabir) under the Turkic slave-general Fa'iq. During this period the Samanid dynasty was in heavy decline and was struggling for holding control over Khurasan and Transoxiana from several ambitious military leaders who had rebelled against their authority, the most dangerous ones being Fa'iq and the Simjurid Abu 'Ali Simjuri.

The Ghaznavid prince and Samanid general Sebüktigin, however, managed to defeat the rebels, but soon took control over Khurasan, while the remains of the Samanid dynasty in Bukhara was conquered by the Kara-Khanid Khanate. Isfarayini shortly changed his allegiance to the Ghaznavids, where he rose to prominent offices. In 997, Sebüktigin died and was succeeded by his son Ismail, who soon, however, was defeated by his brother Mahmud, who crowned himself as the new ruler of the Ghaznavid dynasty, and shortly appointed Isfarayini as his vizier, thus making Isfarayini become the first vizier of the Ghaznavid dynasty. Isfarayini later changed the administrate language of the Ghaznavid state from Arabic to Persian.

Isfarayini's main task was to find the money to finance the military campaigns of the Ghaznavids, and managed to accomplish that for a few years; he managed to raise a large sum in only two days. However, the situation became troublesome by drought and consequent bad harvest, and a plague that followed. Still in 1010/1, Isfarayini managed to raise a considerable amount in Herat, which, however, was not enough for Mahmud, who ordered him to also use his own money to finance the Ghaznavid military campaigns. Isfarayini, however, disobeyed, and went voluntarily to prison; his property was confiscated and when he was accused of extortion, he was brutally tortured, which resulted in his death in 1013/4. Some authors mention that one of the reasons for the downfall of Isfarayini was because of a quarrel between Mahmud and Isfarayini over a Turkic slave.

Isfarayini was succeeded by Ahmad Maymandi, who restored Arabic as the administrate language of the Ghaznavid state. Isfarayini had a son named Hajjaj, who became a prominent scholar, and an unnamed daughter.

References

Sources 
 
 
 
 

10th-century births
1010s deaths
Year of birth unknown
10th-century Iranian politicians
11th-century Iranian politicians
Ghaznavid viziers
Samanid officials
People from Khorasan